Ultrachrist is a 2003 comedy film directed by Kerry Douglas Dye and starring Jonathan C. Green as Jesus/Ultrachrist. The film was produced by LeisureSuit Media and written by Kerry Douglas Dye and Jordan Hoffman.

Premise
Jesus Christ returns to modern-day New York City to fulfill biblical prophecies and usher in 2000 years of godly peace.  When he discovers that he is unable to relate to modern youth, he dons a superhero costume and appears to the world as Ultrachrist!

References

External links 

Ultrachrist! Home Page
Viewable at CinemaNow

2003 films
Fiction about God
Portrayals of Jesus in film
Religious comedy films
2003 comedy films
2000s English-language films